The 1946 Czechoslovak presidential election took place on 19 June 1946. It was the first election since the end of World War II. Edvard Beneš was elected for his second term.

Background
Edvard Beneš resigned in 1938 and emigrated to the United Kingdom. He formed the Czechoslovak government-in-exile and led the Czechoslovak resistance against Nazi Germany which occupied Czechoslovakia. He returned to Czechoslovakia after World War II and was confirmed as the President of Czechoslovakia in October 1945 by the votes of parliament.

Voting
The election was held on 19 June 1946. Beneš was the only candidate. He received all 298 votes.

References

Presidential
1946
Single-candidate elections